Merchiston Hospital was a mental health facility on Barochan Road in Brookfield, Renfrewshire, Scotland. It was managed by NHS Greater Glasgow and Clyde.

History
The facility, which was commissioned as a replacement for Broadfield Hospital at Port Glasgow, was established by converting a 19th-century building known as Merchiston House in 1948. Two new wings were added in 1958. Modern facilities were created on the site in 1984 and the mansion was subsequently demolished. After services transferred to the Southern General Hospital, Merchiston Hospital closed in 2008. The buildings were demolished in 2013 in order to better secure the site.

References

Hospitals in Renfrewshire
1948 establishments in Scotland
Hospitals established in 1948
Hospital buildings completed in 1948
Defunct hospitals in Scotland
2008 disestablishments in Scotland
Hospitals disestablished in 2008